Tatenda Marshal Mkuruva (born 4 January 1996) is a Zimbabwean professional footballer who plays as a goalkeeper for National Independent Soccer Association club Michigan Stars FC. He has also represented the Zimbabwe national team.

Career

Youth career
Mkuruva began his career with Budiriro Gunners FC (2007-2008) in Harare and joined Dynamos Juniors 2008-2012.

Senior career

Dynamos
In 2013, Mkuruva joined Zimbabwe Premier Soccer League club Dynamos on a three-year contract. He made 23 league appearances.

Cape Town City
In February 2017, he joined Premier Soccer League club Cape Town City on a three-year contract.

Buildcon
On 2 January 2018, MTN/FAZ Super Division club Buildcon F.C confirmed that they had reached a deal with Mkuruva to sign on a year as free agent.

Michigan Stars
Mkuruva moved to America after a year in Zambia. In September 2019, he signed with Michigan Stars ahead of their inaugural season in the National Independent Soccer Association.

International
Mkuruva represented Zimbabwe at the under-17, under-20 and under-23 level before making his senior debut in 2016. He represented Zimbabwe national team at the 2017 Africa Cup of Nations.

Honours

Club
Dynamos
 Zimbabwe Premier Soccer League: 2013, 2014, 2015
 Mbada Diamonds Cup: 2012-2013
 Zimbabwean Independence Trophy : 2013
Cape Town City
 MTN 8: 2017 : Runners

Individual
Dynamos
 Rookie of the Year: 2015
 Soccer Star of the Year: 2015

References

External links

Living people
1996 births
Zimbabwean footballers
Sportspeople from Harare
Association football goalkeepers
Dynamos F.C. players
Cape Town City F.C. (2016) players
Zimbabwe international footballers
2017 Africa Cup of Nations players
Zimbabwean expatriate footballers
Expatriate soccer players in South Africa
Zimbabwean expatriate sportspeople in South Africa
Expatriate footballers in Zambia
Zimbabwean expatriate sportspeople in Zambia
Expatriate soccer players in the United States
Zimbabwean expatriate sportspeople in the United States
National Premier Soccer League players
Buildcon F.C. players
Zimbabwe A' international footballers
2016 African Nations Championship players